Grand Casino Lipica is located in Lipica, Sežana Slovenia, It is owned and operated by Casino Portorož d.d. The casino was renovated in 2016.

History

Background
The main attraction of Lipica is the stud farm, where world renowned Lipizzan horses are bred. The stud farm was established by Archduke Charles in 1580.

References

External links

Casinos in Slovenia